Paloma Baeza (born 1 May 1975) is a British actress and director of English and Mexican heritage. Her 2017 film Poles Apart won the BAFTA for best animated short film in 2018.

Biography
Baeza was born in London and spent her childhood in Mexico. Her Mexican father and her British mother were musicians who met in the UK. In 1975, when Baeza was five months old, her parents married in London and they went to Mexico City. They divorced nine years later.

She returned to the UK with her mother in 1985, when she was nine. She began taking acting classes and appeared very early in the London theatres and British television productions. She studied English and Performing Arts at the University of Bristol.

Baeza has acted in a number of films and television programmes, including the 1998 film Far from the Madding Crowd playing the leading role of Bathsheba Everdene, and the 2008 BBC production The Passion as Mary Magdalene. She has also performed on stage, including Navy Pier in 2000 and The Flight Into Egypt in 1996.

Baeza directed a short feature film Watchmen in 2001, which she wrote with actor Cillian Murphy, who also starred. She directed the TV film The Window in 2006. 
Baeza decided to study animation at the National Film and Television School. For her graduation project, she made the stop-motion short film "Poles Apart", which won the BAFTA award for Best Animated Short Film in 2018.  In 2018, she began directing a CG/live-action film, The Toymaker's Secret, written by her husband Alex Garland. She is also working on a project on the life of Frida Kahlo.

Personal life
Baeza is married to screenwriter, novelist, and film director Alex Garland; they have a son, Milo, and a daughter, Eva.

Filmography

Film

Television

Directing credits
 Watchmen (short film, 2001)
 The Window (TV film, 2006)
 The Odds (short film, 2009)
 Poles Apart (short film, 2017)
 The House (Netflix film, 2022)*
 The Toymaker's Secret (TBA)

*Paloma Baeza only directed the third and last part of The House’s collection of short stories.

Awards
 BAFTA award for British Short Animation – Poles Apart (2018)

References

External links

Baeza's page on her agent's website

Living people
1975 births
21st-century English actresses
Actresses from London
Actresses of Mexican descent
BAFTA winners (people)
British actors of Latin American descent
English television actresses
English film actresses
English film directors
English people of Mexican descent
Place of birth missing (living people)
Alumni of the National Film and Television School